KOKS is a restaurant located in Leynavatn, located 24 km north of Tórshavn and 23 km east of the airport in the Faroe Islands. It offers a 17-course tasting menu and won its first Michelin star in 2017. KOKS’ head chef is Poul Andrias Ziska, a 28-year-old chef and native of Tórshavn. The restaurant has nine chefs, each of whom is from a different country, and five waiters. The restaurant serves only 30 customers a night and has a scenic view over a lake.  The Michelin star that KOKS won was the first to be awarded in the Faroes. In addition, they were named the second best restaurant in the Danish kingdom in the White Guide in 2017. The head chef, Ziska, was also awarded as the chef talent of the year, given to one up-and-coming chef under 30.

Koks started in April 2011 and was launched by Johannes Jensen who owns 12 restaurants. It started out in the dining room of the Føroyar hotel. The restaurant is only open from April to September. It was located in Kirkjubøur, 11 km south of Tórshavn until 2017, but then moved to Leynavatn, an area administered by the National Trust. It was awarded a second Michelin star in February 2019, retained in 2021. For the summer of 2022, KOKS is scheduled for Ilimanaq in Greenland.

References

External links 

Restaurants established in 2011
Restaurants in the Faroe Islands
Michelin Guide starred restaurants in Denmark